Valar Pirai is a 1962 Indian Tamil-language drama film, directed by D. Yoganand. The film stars Sivaji Ganesan and B. Saroja Devi. It was released on 30 March 1962.

Plot

Cast 
Sivaji Ganesan as Kanagu/Kanagasundaram
B. Saroja Devi as Saraswathi
T. S. Balaiah as Dharmalingam
M. V. Rajamma as Nallamma
M. R. Radha as Krishnapuram Pannaiyar
V. Nagayya as Govindharajan
Javar Seetharaman as Varatharajan
K. A. Thangavelu as Pickpocket Mani
M. Saroja as Sundari

Soundtrack 
The music was composed by K. V. Mahadevan, with lyrics by Kannadasan.

Release and reception 
Valar Pirai was released on 30 March 1962, and distributed by Sri Rama Films. Kanthan of Kalki criticised the film for its numerous plot holes.

References

External links 
 

1960s Tamil-language films
1962 drama films
1962 films
Films scored by K. V. Mahadevan
Films with screenplays by Javar Seetharaman
Indian drama films